Kevin Michael Maggs (born 3 June 1974) is a former Irish rugby union centre. He is currently a scout for the IRFU Ireland national rugby union team. He previously played for Bristol, Bath, Ulster and Rotherham Titans. Started his adult rugby career in Bristol with local side Imperial RFC.

Maggs played for Ireland because Brian Ashton, who was Irish coach at time, came to Bristol to watch flanker David Corkery and was told by Ralph Knibbs (Bristol's player-manager), that Maggs had a grandfather from Limerick. He was then called up to the Irish development tour to New Zealand in 1997. He made his international debut for Ireland against New Zealand at Lansdowne Road in November 1997 and played at the 1999 and 2003 Rugby World Cup.

Honours
 2006 Celtic League winners medal

References

External links
 
 Ireland Rugby Profile
 Sporting Heroes Profile
 Ulster Rugby Profile
 

1974 births
Living people
Bath Rugby players
Belfast Harlequins rugby union players
Bristol Bears players
Ireland international rugby union players
English people of Irish descent
English rugby union players
Moseley Rugby Football Club players
Rotherham Titans players
Ulster Rugby players
Irish Exiles rugby union players
Rugby union players from Bristol
Rugby union centres
Irish rugby union players
Citizens of Ireland through descent